The 1944 Lehigh Engineers football team was an American football team that represented Lehigh University during the 1944 college football season. In its second season under head coach Leo Prendergast, the team compiled an 0–6 record, including four losses against Middle Three Conference rivals.  

The team played its home games at Taylor Stadium in Bethlehem, Pennsylvania.

Schedule

References

Lehigh
Lehigh Mountain Hawks football seasons
College football winless seasons
Lehigh Engineers football